Outback were a world music group founded in the late 1980s by multi-instrumentalists Graham Wiggins and Martin Cradick. The group fused traditional Australian tribal music, represented primarily through Wiggins's didgeridoo, with modern Western music, mostly Cradick's steel-string guitar. Before the band dissolved in 1992, it had been joined by Senegalese percussionist Sagar N'Gom, French violinist Paddy Le Mercier and drummer Ian Campbell.

Biography 

Outback were formed when Martin Cradick (guitar, mandolin, African drums, shaker) and Graham Wiggins (didgeridoo, melodica) met in Oxford in 1988. The duo performed throughout England and released a five-track extended play, Didgeridoo and Guitar, on cassette which was recorded in October and November of that year. Four tracks were recorded and engineered by John Duggan while a live track, "Didgeridelay", was recorded at Balliol College by Michael Gerzon; the EP appeared via March Hare Music.

Their first album, Baka, was self-financed named after a pygmy tribe from Cameroon and released in 1990 on Hannibal Records.

Their first album meeting international success, the duo was able to add Senegalese Sagar N'Gom with his West African percussions and Ian Campbell on the drums. The unusual band would only live for a short time though, producing only one second and final album, Dance the Devil Away, where they were joined by French fiddler Paddy LeMercier.

The band dissolved in 1992. Martin Cradick soon founded with his wife Su Hart the group Baka Beyond, which would later be joined by N'Gom and LeMercier. Graham Wiggins on the other hand founded Dr Didg with Ian Campbell and guitarist Mark Revell.

Members 

 Martin Cradick (Guitar, mandolin, darbuka, bendir, luthar, jengu, Shaker)
 Graham Wiggins (Didgeridoo, melodica)
 Sagar N'Gom (Djembe, mbala, tama)
 Ian Campbell (Drum kit)
 Paddy Le Mercier (violin)

Discography 

 1988: Didgeridoo and Guitar
 1990: Baka
 1991: Dance the Devil Away

See also

Baka Beyond

References

External links 

 Outback Music
 
 
 Outback Baka
 Outback Dance the Devil Away

British world music groups
Musical groups established in 1988
Musical groups from Oxford